Abd al-Karīm al-Jīlī, or Abdul Karim Jili (Arabic:عبدالكريم جيلى) was a Muslim Sufi saint and mystic who was born in 1365, in what is modern day Iraq, possibly in the neighborhood of Jil in Baghdad. He is known in Muslim mysticism as the author of Universal Man.

Jili was a descendant of the Sufi saint Abdul Qadir Gilani, the founder of the Qadiriyya dervish order. Although little is known about his life, historians have noted that Jili travelled in various places around the world. He wrote more than twenty books, of which Universal Man is the best known. 

Jili was the foremost systematizer and one of the greatest exponents of the work of Ibn Arabi. Universal Man is an explanation of Ibn Arabi's teachings on the structure of reality and human perfection. Since it was written, it has been held up as one of the masterpieces of Sufi literature. Jili conceived of the Absolute Being as a Self, a line of thinking which later influenced the 20th century Muslim philosopher and poet Muhammad Iqbal.

See also
 Al Akbariyya (Sufi school)

References

1365 births
1424 deaths
Sufi writers
Sunni Muslims
Sunni Sufis
Akbarian Sufis
Sufi saints